German submarine U-873 was a German long-range Type IXD2 U-boat of World War II. Following the surrender of Germany, the United States Navy studied U-873 to improve United States submarine designs. U-873 is remembered for the controversial treatment of its crew as prisoners of war and the death of commanding officer Kapitänleutnant Friedrich Steinhoff in a Boston jail cell. Six months after Steinhoff's death, his brother was one of the Operation Paperclip rocket scientists from Peenemünde arriving in the United States to work at White Sands Missile Range.

Design
German Type IXD2 submarines were considerably larger than the original Type IXs. U-873 had a displacement of  when at the surface and  while submerged. She had two shafts and two  propellers.

U-873 was fitted with six  torpedo tubes (four fitted at the bow and two at the stern), 24 torpedoes, one  SK C/32 naval gun, 150 rounds, and a  Flak M42 with 2575 rounds as well as two  C/30 anti-aircraft guns with 8100 rounds. The boat had a complement of fifty-five.

Service history
U-873 was commissioned on 1 March 1944 under the command of Kapitänleutnant Friedrich Steinhoff and assigned to the 4th U-boat Flotilla for training in the Baltic Sea from the base in Stettin. On 29 July 1944 a small aerial bomb struck the control room of U-873 during a bombing raid on Bremen which injured four of the crew. Crewman Fritz Grusa died of his injuries. U-873 completed repairs in November. A Deschimag Type I schnorchel was fitted in December.

Upon completion of training on 31 January 1945 U-873 was assigned to the 33rd U-boat Flotilla at Flensburg for war patrols to the Atlantic Ocean. U-873 departed from Kiel on 17 February 1945 and arrived in Horten Naval Base on 22 February. U-873 sailed from Horten on 21 March 1945 and reached Kristiansand the following day. U-873 sailed from Kristiansand on 30 March 1945 and was proceeding to an assigned operations area in the Caribbean Sea when Germany surrendered on 8 May. Vance placed a prize crew aboard U-873 and escorted the U-boat to Portsmouth Naval Shipyard on 16 May. U-873 was placed in dry dock for a design study of the Type IXD2 class of U-boats by Portsmouth Naval Shipyard engineers; and was later transferred to the Philadelphia Naval Shipyard. Following completion of trials, the U-boat was scrapped in 1948.

Portsmouth

German Type IX submarine  had arrived at Portsmouth the day before U-873 arrived, and  arrived the following day. The German Type X submarine  arrived on 19 May. Possessions of the crews of these U-boats had been scattered by the prize crews in the process of searching for intelligence information and evidence of sabotage. Upon arrival at Portsmouth the U-boat crews were sent to Portsmouth Naval Prison for interrogation by the Office of Naval Intelligence (ONI). Subsequent investigation concluded personal possessions of the U-boat crewmen were looted contrary to provisions of the Geneva Convention.

Following interrogation at Portsmouth Naval Prison, the handcuffed crew of U-873 was pelted with insults and garbage while marching through the streets of Boston to the Suffolk County Charles Street Jail to await transfer to a prisoner-of-war camp in Mississippi.

Commanding Officer
Friedrich Steinhoff was born in Küllstedt on 14 July 1909 and was a merchant marine officer prior to joining Kriegsmarine crew 34. After serving with the 4th minesweeping flotilla from December 1939 to May 1940, he was a watch officer aboard  from July through October 1941. He then commanded  during rocket launching experiments of 1942 in cooperation with his brother Ernst Steinhoff, who was Director for Flight Mechanics, Ballistics, Guidance Control, and Instrumentation at the Peenemünde Army Research Center. Command of U-873 was preceded by a year of staff duty with the 7th U-boat Flotilla.

U-873 crewman Georg Seitz reported Steinhoff's face was bleeding and swollen when he returned to his cell after being questioned by a civilian ONI interrogator who ordered a husky United States Marine Corps guard to slap the officer. On 19 May 1945 Steinhoff bled to death in his Boston jail cell from wrist wounds, possibly inflicted with the broken lens of his sunglasses. He was buried in grave 934 at Fort Devens.

Armament

FLAK weaponry
U-873 was mounted with the rare Twin 3.7 cm Flakzwilling M43U on the DLM42 mount. This was one of the best AA weapons used by Nazi Germany's Kriegsmarine during World War II. The DLM42 mount was mainly used on the Type IX as it was rather heavy for the Type VII U-boats. The 3.7 cm Flak M42U was the naval version of the 3.7 cm Flak used by the Kriegsmarine on Type VII and Type IX U-boats.

References

Bibliography

Paterson, Lawrence Black Flag: The Surrender of Germany's U-Boat Forces MBI Publishing (2009) 
Taylor, J.C. German Warships of World War II Doubleday & Company (1967)

External links

World War II submarines of Germany
German Type IX submarines
U-boats commissioned in 1944
1943 ships
Ships built in Bremen (state)